Piwi like RNA-mediated gene silencing 4 is a protein that in humans is encoded by the PIWIL4 gene.

Function

PIWIL4 belongs to the Argonaute family of proteins, which function in development and maintenance of germline stem cells (Sasaki et al., 2003 [PubMed 12906857]).

References

Further reading